"After Light"  is a single by Scottish musician Rustie, featuring vocals from Aluna Francis of AlunaGeorge. The song was released in the United Kingdom as a digital download on 23 July 2012 from his debut studio album Glass Swords. The song features added vocals on top of an instrumental track of the same name, which was released in 2011. The song reached number 173 on the UK Singles Chart.

Track listing

Charts

Release history

References

2011 songs
2012 singles
AlunaGeorge songs
Rustie songs
Warp (record label) singles